Joe Ciresi (born September 15, 1970) is an American politician and Democratic member of the Pennsylvania House of Representatives, representing the 146th district. Located in Montgomery County, the district includes all of Limerick Township, Lower Pottsgrove Township, Perkiomen Township, Royersford, Trappe, and parts of Pottstown.

Political career

Spring-Ford Area School District 
Ciresi was first elected to the Spring-Ford Area School District School Board in 2003, representing the 3rd region. He served on the board until 2017.

Pennsylvania House of Representatives

2016 election 

In 2016, Ciresi launched his campaign for the Pennsylvania House of Representatives to represent the 146th District, challenging Republican incumbent Tom Quigley. He was one of 10 candidates for the PA House to be endorsed by President Barack Obama. Ciresi was defeated in the general election by Quigley by nearly 600 votes, in one of the tightest margins for a state house race.

2018 election 

In 2017, Ciresi announced he would challenge Quigley to a rematch for the 146th district. Both candidates were unopposed in their respective primaries.

Receiving the endorsement of Barack Obama once again, Ciresi defeated Quigley in the general election, reversing his fortunes from 2016.

2020 election 

In January 2020, Ciresi launched his re-election campaign. He was unopposed in the primary and faced Republican Tom Neafcy, a Limerick Township supervisor. Ciresi defeated Neafcy in the general election, winning nearly 57% of the vote.

Results

Tenure 
Ciresi was sworn in on January 1, 2019.

Committee assignments 
Commerce
Education
Gaming Oversight
Tourism & Recreational Development

References

External links

Living people
People from Montgomery County, Pennsylvania
Democratic Party members of the Pennsylvania House of Representatives
21st-century American politicians
University of Miami alumni
1970 births
Candidates in the 2016 United States elections